Hermine Heller-Ostersetzer (1874-1909) was a painter and graphic artist from the Austro-Hungarian Empire.

Biography
Heller-Ostersetzer was born on 23 July 1874 in Vienna, Austria. She attended the University of Applied Arts Vienna. She died in Grimmenstein, Austria on 8 March 1909.

Legacy
Her work was included in the 2019 exhibition City Of Women: Female artists in Vienna from 1900 to 1938 at the Österreichische Galerie Belvedere.

References

External links
  

1874 births
1909 deaths
Austro-Hungarian artists